A white elephant is a supposedly valuable possession whose cost exceeds its usefulness.

White Elephant or white elephant may also refer to:

 White elephant (animal), a rare kind of albino elephant (not a distinct species)

Film and television 
 White Elephant (1984 film), a British comedy drama
 White Elephant (2012 film), an Argentine drama
 White Elephant (2022 film), an American action film
 "The White Elephant", an episode of the British television series The Avengers
 White Elephant award, given by the Russian Guild of Film Critics

Music 
 White Elephant (band), a jazz-rock big band led by Mike Mainieri
 "White Elephant", a single by Ladytron from their album Gravity the Seducer
 The White Elephant Sessions, an album by Jars of Clay

Other uses
 White Elephant (Shahnameh), an animal in the Persian epic poem the Shahnameh
 White Elephant Butte, a mountain in Nevada, U.S.
 White elephant gift exchange, a holiday party game
 White elephant sale, a sale of used items
 Order of the White Elephant, a Thai honour
 White Elephant Saloon, in the San Antonio Sporting District, Texas
 White Elephant, in Hell's Half Acre, Fort Worth, Texas